The 1720 class are a class of diesel locomotives built between 1966 and 1970 by Clyde Engineering, Eagle Farm for Queensland Railways in Australia.

History
The 1720 class were an evolution of the 1700 class. They operated throughout Queensland on branchline freight, suburban and mainline passenger services and on shunting duties. Later they were modified for driver only operation receiving a larger windscreen.

Some have been exported, although the majority as at January 2014 remain in service. Unit 1741 was acquired for preservation by the Queensland Diesel Restoration Group in October 2016.

Gallery

References

Aurizon diesel locomotives
Clyde Engineering locomotives
Co-Co locomotives
Diesel locomotives of Queensland
Queensland Rail locomotives
Railway locomotives introduced in 1966
Diesel-electric locomotives of Australia
3 ft 6 in gauge locomotives of Australia